Horwich Town Council is a local authority with limited powers and covers the town and civil parish of Horwich in the Metropolitan Borough of Bolton, Greater Manchester, England. It is made up of fourteen elected Town Councillors, representing six electoral wards. Four of the Wards elect two Councillors while two other Wards elect three Councillors.

History
Under the Local Government Act 1972, Horwich Urban District Council was abolished in 1974 and its area became a successor parish authority in the Metropolitan Borough of Bolton.

Letters Patent granting arms to Horwich Town Council
The following is the full text of the letters patent issued by the College of Arms granting armorial bearings:

To All and Singular to whom these Presents shall come Sir Anthony Richard Wagner, Knight Commander of the Royal Victorian Order, Garter Principal King of Arms, John Riddell Bromhead Walker, Esquire, Member of the Royal Victorian Order, upon whom has been conferred the Decoration of the Military Cross, Clarenceux King of Arms and Walter John George Verco, Esquire, Commander of the Royal Victorian Order, Norroy and Ulster King of Arms send Greeting! 
Whereas, Desmond Smith, Gentleman, Town Mayor of the Town of Horwich did represent unto The Most Noble Bernard Marmaduke, Duke of Norfolk, Knight of the Most Noble Order of the Garter, Knight Grand Cross of the Royal Victorian Order, Knight Grand Cross of the Most Excellent Order of the British Empire, upon whom has been conferred the Territorial Decoration, Earl Marshal and Hereditary Marshal of England and One of Her Majesty's Most Honourable Privy Council, now deceased, that pursuant to the provisions of the Local Government Act 1972, the Council of the Parish of Horwich was established as a successor Parish Authority to the then existing Urban District of Horwich and that in accordance with the said Act the Council of the Parish of Horwich adopted on the Ninth day of January 1974 the status of a Town and accordingly the Parish Council of Horwich is now the Town Council of Horwich. That the Town Council is desirous of having Armorial Bearing duly established with lawful authority and he therefore as Town Mayor of the Town of Horwich and on behalf of the Council thereof did request the favour of His Grace's Warrant for Our granting and assigning such Arms and Crest as We may consider fit and proper to be borne and used by the Town Council of Horwich on its Common Seal or otherwise according to the Laws of Arms. And forasmuch as the said Earl Marshal did by Warrant under his hand and Seal bearing date the Sixth day of December 1974 authorise and direct Us to grant and assign such Arms and Crest accordingly Know Ye therefore that We the said Garter, Clarenceux and Norroy and Ulster in pursuance of His Grace's Warrant and by virtue of the Letters Patent of Our several Offices to each of Us respectively granted do by these Presents grant and assign unto the Town Council of Horwich the Arms following that is to say:
Vert a Hart courant proper gorged with an Ancient Crown on a Chief or a Cross Flory Gules voided of the Chief between four Pallets two and two Sable all between two Roses Gules barbed and seeded proper. And for the Crest on a Wreath Argent and Gules a Huntsman habited and drawing his bow all proper.

Powers and functions
Horwich Town Council acts as a channel of local opinion to Bolton Metropolitan Borough Council, and as such has the right to be informed on any planning decisions affecting the civil parish. The town council receives funding by levying a "precept" on the council tax paid by the residents of the civil parish. It has the powers to provide crime prevention measures (such as CCTV) and to contribute money towards traffic calming schemes. The town council also gives grants to local voluntary organisations, and sponsoring public events, including Horwich in Bloom, a local version of Britain in Bloom. Since 1997, the town council awards every two years civic medals to people of Horwich who provided exemplary service to the town.

Wards
Horwich is divided into six Wards, each of which elect between two or three Town Councillors:

Mayors of Horwich
Each year the Town Council elects one of the Town Councillors to become the Town Mayor who represents the town over the municipal year. It is a ceremonial position and a few of the holders have held the position more than once: Elizabeth McCracken held it four times and Kevan James Helsby, Alice Kilcoyne, Robert Ronson, John Bragg, Kenneth Malcolm Denton, Joyce Kellett, Stephen Michael Rock, Gordon Stone and Susan Denton have held it twice.

Twin town
Horwich is twinned with the town of Crowborough in East Sussex. They entered into a unique twinning arrangement when they became the first towns within the United Kingdom to sign a Town Twinning Charter. The charter was signed by the Mayors of Horwich and Crowborough at a ceremony in the Public Hall, Horwich on the 22 March 1990 and in the Town Hall, Crowborough on the 27 March 1990. On the 25th anniversary of the Town Twinning, in March 2015, the Mayor of Horwich, Cllr. Richard E W Silvester and the Mayor of Crowborough, Cllr. Ronald G Reed signed 25th Anniversary celebratory Town Twinning documents in Crowborough Town Hall on Tuesday 10 March 2015 and in Horwich Public Hall on Thursday 19 March 2015, to re-new the twinning agreement. Horwich Cycle Club members travelled down to Crowborough on Friday 15 May 2015 and cycled with members of Wealden Cycle Club over that weekend as part of the celebrations.

References

Parish councils of England
Local government in the Metropolitan Borough of Bolton
Local precepting authorities in England
Local authorities in Greater Manchester
Town Council